Drake McElroy is an X Games competitor from United States who has competed in the Championship since 1993, winning the AMA Pro Grand National Championship in 2000. Bronze Medal Winner in MotoX Freestyle at X Games VIII, held in Philadelphia, Pennsylvania 15–19 August 2002.

Good reference:

AMA Pro Flat Track

Write Short AMA History Here. He is one of 15 riders to complete the Dirt Track "Grand Slam"—victories on short track, TT, half-mile, and mile courses.
In addition to his 2000 AMA Grand National Championship, he earned the 1999 and 2000 AMA 600 Hotshot and Supertracker Championships.

F-USA Dirt Track

Kopp raced Clear Channel's F-USA Dirt Track series in 2002 and 2003, winning the 2002 Plymouth, Wisconsin Short Track on a KTM.

AMA Pro Supermoto Championship

Kopp raced in the AMA Supermoto Championship in 2003 with the HMC KTM Team. He qualified for a chance at the championship by being one of the 74 riders who qualified for the winner-take-all final.  Write Short AMA History Here

Pikes Peak International Hill Climb

Kopp competed in the 2011 Pikes Peak International Hill Climb on a Team Latus Triumph Speed Triple. He was the second-fastest motorcycle racer up the mountain, and won the Exhibition Class with a time of 11:26.530.

Career highlights

2000- AMA Grand National Champion, Supertracker Champion, Hotshoe Champion    Corbin Harley-Davidson XR-750, KTM 505, Suzuki TL1000
2001- 3rd, AMA Grand National Championship   Corbin Harley-Davidson XR-750, KTM 505
2003- 3rd, AMA Grand National Championship    KTM Harley-Davidson XR-750, KTM 450
2004- 2nd, AMA Grand National Championship    KTM Harley-Davidson XR-750, KTM 450
2005- 3rd, AMA Grand National Championship    Latus H-D Harley-Davidson XR-750, Honda CRF450
2006- 3rd, AMA Grand National Championship    Latus H-D Harley-Davidson XR-750, Honda CRF450
2008- 2nd, AMA Grand National Championship    Latus H-D Harley-Davidson XR-750, Honda CRF450
2009- 2nd, AMA Grand National Championship   Latus H-D Harley-Davidson XR-750, Honda CRF450
2010- 2nd, AMA Grand National Championship    Latus H-D Harley-Davidson XR-750, Lloyd Bros. Ducati 1000, Honda CRF450

References

External links
  "Smokin’" Joe Kopp Official Site

1969 births
Living people
American motorcycle racers
AMA Grand National Championship riders
Sportspeople from Spokane, Washington